Ionica Munteanu (born 7 January 1979) is a Romanian female handballer.

International honours
EHF Cup Winners' Cup:
Finalist: 2008
EHF Cup: 
Semifinalist: 2005, 2009
EHF Challenge Cup:
Winner: 2006

Individual awards
Championnat de France Best Goalkeeper: 2004

References

1979 births
Sportspeople from Bucharest
Living people
Romanian female handball players
Expatriate handball players
Romanian expatriate sportspeople in Denmark
Romanian expatriate sportspeople in France
Romanian expatriate sportspeople in Germany
CS Minaur Baia Mare (women's handball) players
Handball players at the 2016 Summer Olympics
Olympic handball players of Romania